Ricardo Villarreal García (San Miguel de Allende, Guanajuato, April 12th, 1981) is a Mexican politician and lawyer member of the PAN. In 2013 he served as Deputy of the LXII Legislature of the Mexican Congress representing Guanajuato. He was the municipal president of San Miguel de Allende from 2015 to 2018, time during which the City won the title of Best City in the World by Travel& Leisure Magazine. He was also president of the Association of Mexican World Heritage Cities in 2017 and Vice-president of the Organization of World Heritage Cities. He is currently Deputy of the LXIV Legislature of the Mexican Congress representing District 02 of Guanajuato.

References

1981 births
Living people
Politicians from Guanajuato
21st-century Mexican lawyers
National Action Party (Mexico) politicians
People from San Miguel de Allende
Municipal presidents in Guanajuato
21st-century Mexican politicians
Escuela Libre de Derecho alumni
Members of the Chamber of Deputies (Mexico) for Guanajuato